Untold Stories may refer to:


Books 
Untold Stories, a 2005 book by Alan Bennett

Film and TV
The Untold Story, a 1993 Hong Kong crime-thriller film
Untold Stories of the E.R., a docudrama television series
Untold Stories, a spin-off of the Filipino talk show Face to Face

Music

Albums 
Untold Stories (Hot Rize album), 1987
Untold Stories (Heitor Pereira album), 2001

Songs 
"Untold Stories" (Kathy Mattea song), a 1988 song 
"Untold Stories" (Buju Banton song), a 1995 song

See also
Untold Story (disambiguation)
Stories Untold (disambiguation)